The Journal of Limnology is a triannual peer-reviewed open access scientific journal covering all aspects of limnology, including the ecology, biology, microbiology, geology, physics, and chemistry of freshwater habitats, as well as the impact of human activities and the management and conservation of inland aquatic ecosystems. It was established in 1942 as the Memorie dell’Istituto Italiano di Idrobiologia by the Water Research Institute (Verbania) of which it is still the official journal, obtaining its current title in 1999.

Abstracting and indexing
The journal is abstracted and indexed by  Aquatic Sciences and Fisheries Abstracts, BIOSIS Previews, EBSCO databases, GEOBASE, Science Citation Index Expanded, and Scopus.

Notable articles
The three most highly cited papers published in the journal are:
Jeppesen, E., Meerhoff, M., Davidson, T. A., Trolle, D., SondergaarD, M., Lauridsen, T. L., ... & Nielsen, A. 
Michalczyk, Ł., & Kaczmarek, Ł. 
Hall, R.

References

External links
 

English-language journals
Publications established in 1942
Ecology journals
Triannual journals